Dek siw (Thai language: เด็กซิ่ว) means "fossil student" and refers to Thai students who have graduated from high school but not yet entered a university. Dek siw spend a  year (or more) studying at home or at cram school  hoping to do better on GAT-PAT, O-Net and the central examinations for a better chance to gain admittance a top university.

References

See also
Rōnin
Gaokao
Juku
Cram school
Jaesusaeng
Bǔ kè

Thai words and phrases
Education in Thailand
Academic pressure in East Asian culture